The Samsung Galaxy S is a series of high-end Android phones made by Samsung. It may refer to:

Smartphones 
 Samsung Galaxy S
 Samsung Galaxy SL
 Samsung Galaxy S Plus
 Samsung Galaxy S Advance
 Samsung Galaxy S Duos
 Samsung Galaxy S Duos 2
 Samsung Galaxy S Duos 3
 Samsung Galaxy S II
 Samsung Galaxy S II Plus
 Samsung Galaxy S III
 Samsung Galaxy S III Neo
 Samsung Galaxy S III Mini
 Samsung Galaxy S III Mini Value Edition
 Samsung Galaxy S4
 Samsung Galaxy S4 Active
 Samsung Galaxy S4 Zoom
 Samsung Galaxy S4 Mini
 Samsung Galaxy S4 Mini Plus
 Samsung Galaxy S5
 Samsung Galaxy S5 Neo
 Samsung Galaxy S5 Active
 Samsung Galaxy S5 Mini
 Samsung Galaxy S6
 Samsung Galaxy S6 Edge
 Samsung Galaxy S6 Edge+
 Samsung Galaxy S6 Active
 Samsung Galaxy S7
 Samsung Galaxy S7 Edge
 Samsung Galaxy S7 Active
 Samsung Galaxy S8
 Samsung Galaxy S8+
 Samsung Galaxy S8 Active
 Samsung Galaxy S9
 Samsung Galaxy S9+
 Samsung Galaxy S10
 Samsung Galaxy S10+
 Samsung Galaxy S10 5G
 Samsung Galaxy S10 Lite
 Samsung Galaxy S10e
 Samsung Galaxy S20
 Samsung Galaxy S20+
 Samsung Galaxy S20+ BTS Edition
 Samsung Galaxy S20 Ultra
 Samsung Galaxy S20 FE
 Samsung Galaxy S20 Tactical Edition
 Samsung Galaxy S21
 Samsung Galaxy S21+
 Samsung Galaxy S21 Ultra
 Samsung Galaxy S21 FE
 Samsung Galaxy S22
 Samsung Galaxy S22+
 Samsung Galaxy S22 Ultra
 Samsung Galaxy S23
 Samsung Galaxy S23+
 Samsung Galaxy S23 Ultra

Tablet computers 
 Samsung Galaxy Tab S 8.4
 Samsung Galaxy Tab S 10.5
 Samsung Galaxy Tab S2 8.0
 Samsung Galaxy Tab S2 9.7
 Samsung Galaxy Tab S3
 Samsung Galaxy Tab S4
 Samsung Galaxy Tab S5e
 Samsung Galaxy Tab S6
 Samsung Galaxy Tab S6 5G
 Samsung Galaxy Tab S6 Lite
 Samsung Galaxy Tab S7
 Samsung Galaxy Tab S7+
 Samsung Galaxy Tab S7 FE
 Samsung Galaxy Tab S8
 Samsung Galaxy Tab S8+
 Samsung Galaxy Tab S8 Ultra